Oscar Dolson Longstreth (September 4, 1876 – April 29, 1957) was an American football player and coach. He began the storied football program at Little Rock Central High School in (1904) and at Arkansas Teachers College (now known as the University of Central Arkansas) in 1908.

Longstreth was a native of Iowa and was noted to have played quarterback in his collegiate days.

References

External links
 

1876 births
1957 deaths
American football quarterbacks
Central Arkansas Bears and Sugar Bears athletic directors
Central Arkansas Bears football coaches
High school football coaches in Arkansas
University of Iowa alumni
University of Northern Iowa alumni
William H. Bowen School of Law alumni
People from Muscatine, Iowa
Players of American football from Iowa